CP Music Group is a collaborative music label and management team for a roster of artists, songwriters and producers. It co-founded in 2002 as Capital Prophets Records by Lebanese-Canadian entrepreneur Wassim "SAL" Slaiby and Palestinian-Canadian songwriter Belly.

CP Music Group releases

Albums
Massari - Massari (2006, debut album)
Belly - The Revolution (2007, debut album)
Mia Martina - Devotion (2011, debut album)
Belly - Sleepless Nights 1.5 (2012, second album)
Mia Martina - Mia Martina (2014, second album)

Mixtapes
Belly - DBD Vol. 1 (feat. DJ Kool Kid)
Belly - DBD Vol. 2 (feat. DJ Slay Kay)
Belly - DBD Vol. 3 (feat. Big Mike)
Belly - Hate Me Now or Love Me Forever Vol. 1
Belly - Back For the First Time Vol. 1 (feat. DJ Smallz)
Belly - Sleepless Nights (feat. DJ Ill Will)
Belly & Kurupt - The Lost Tapes 2008 (feat. DJ Ill Will)
Belly - The Greatest Dream I Never Had (feat. DJ Drama)

DVDs
Massari - Road to Success

Singles

Awards 
Major awards have been won by Massari and Belly.
Massari - MMVA 2006 (MuchVibe Best Pop Video for Be Easy)
Belly - MMVA 2007 (MuchVibe Best Rap Video for Pressure)
Belly - MMVA 2008 (MuchVibe Best Rap Video Ridin')
Belly - Juno Award 2008 for Hip Hop Recording of The Year
Belly - MMVA 2010 for VideoFACT Indie Video of the Year "Hot Girl"

References

External links
Official CP Music Group  website

Canadian independent record labels
Record labels established in 2002
Companies based in Toronto
2002 establishments in Ontario